Judge Savage may refer to:

Royce H. Savage (1904–1993), judge of the United States District Court for the Northern District of Oklahoma
Timothy J. Savage (born 1946), judge of the United States District Court for the Eastern District of Pennsylvania

See also
Justice Savage (disambiguation)